In Greek mythology, the name Astacus (Ancient Greek: Ἄστακος) may refer to:

Astacus of Thebes, a descendant of the Spartoi, and the eponym of the city Astacus, characterized as "a noble and proud man". One of his sons, Melanippus, was one of the principal defenders of Thebes in the war of the Seven against Thebes and fell against Tydeus. His other three sons, Ismarus, Leades, and Amphidicus (or Asphodicus), were credited with killing Hippomedon, Eteoclus and Parthenopaeus respectively. Yet other two sons of his, Erithelas and Lobes, were said to have founded Hypoplacian Thebes.
Astacus, a son of Poseidon and the nymph Olbia, eponymous founder of Astacus, Bithynia.
Astacus, a son of Hermes and (?) Astabe, a daughter of Peneus; he was father of Iocles (or Oicles?) and through him grandfather of Hipponous.

Notes

References 

 Aeschylus, translated in two volumes. 1. Seven Against Thebes by Herbert Weir Smyth, Ph. D. Cambridge, MA. Harvard University Press. 1926. Online version at the Perseus Digital Library. Greek text available from the same website.
 Apollodorus, The Library with an English Translation by Sir James George Frazer, F.B.A., F.R.S. in 2 Volumes, Cambridge, MA, Harvard University Press; London, William Heinemann Ltd. 1921. ISBN 0-674-99135-4. Online version at the Perseus Digital Library. Greek text available from the same website.
Herodotus, The Histories with an English translation by A. D. Godley. Cambridge. Harvard University Press. 1920. Online version at the Topos Text Project. Greek text available at Perseus Digital Library
 Stephanus of Byzantium, Stephani Byzantii Ethnicorum quae supersunt, edited by August Meineike (1790-1870), published 1849. A few entries from this important ancient handbook of place names have been translated by Brady Kiesling. Online version at the Topos Text Project.

Children of Poseidon
Children of Hermes
Demigods in classical mythology
Theban characters in Greek mythology